Bazan: Alone at the Microphone is a 64-minute DVD featuring David Bazan performing songs from his Pedro the Lion, Headphones, and Bazan solo catalog. The DVD also has candid interviews with Bazan about his family, music, and life on tour.

It was filmed at his home studio near Seattle, WA in mid-2008.

The DVD was released on October 21, 2008. The audio tracks and video outtakes from the DVD were available as free downloads during the pre-order phase before the official release.

Live performances 
 Never Wanted You
 When They Really Get to Know You
 Fewer Moving Parts
 Options
 June 18, 1976
 Slow and Steady Wins the Race
 Cold Beer & Cigarettes
 Shit Talker
 Transcontinental
 Priests & Paramedics
 Please Baby Please

Interview segments 
 Songwriting: Then & Now
 Family
 Disappointed Fans
 Playing Live
 Love Songs

References 

David Bazan albums
2008 video albums
Live video albums
2008 live albums